Packham is a surname. Notable people with the surname include:

Blair Packham, Canadian singer-songwriter
Chris Packham (born 1961), English naturalist, nature photographer, television presenter and writer
David Packham (1832–1912), Australian politician
Greg Packham (born 1959), Australian rules footballer
Jenny Packham (born 1965), British fashion designer
Leonard Packham (1891–1958), Australian cricketer
Marian Packham, Canadian biochemist
Peter Packham (born 1941), English cricket administrator
Will Packham (born 1981), English footballer